The Lachen River is a tributary of the Teesta River in the state of Sikkim, India. It is one of the two main tributaries of the Teesta along with the Lachung River, which rise on opposite sides of the Donga Range in neighbouring Bhutan and converge in Chungthang in the North Sikkim district.

References

Rivers of Sikkim
Rivers of India